Mexicana Universal Guanajuato is a pageant in Guanajuato, Mexico, that selects that state's representative for the national Mexicana Universal pageant.

The State Organization has produced one Nuestra Belleza México titleholder in 2007 with Elisa Nájera and two Nuestra Belleza Mundo México in 1998 with Vilma Zamora and 2011 with Mariana Berumen.

Nuestra Belleza Guanajuato is located at number 5 with three crowns of Nuestra Belleza México/Mexicana Universal.

Titleholders
Below are the names of the annual titleholders of Mexicana Universal Guanajuato, listed in ascending order, and their final placements in the Mexicana Universal after their participation, until 2017 the names was Nuestra Belleza Guanajuato.

 Competed in Miss Universe.
 Competed in Miss World.
 Competed in Miss International.
 Competed in Miss Charm International.
 Competed in Miss Continente Americano.
 Competed in Reina Hispanoamericana.
 Competed in Miss Orb International.
 Competed in Nuestra Latinoamericana Universal.

Designated contestants
As of 2000, it is not uncommon for some States to have more than one delegate competing simultaneously in the national pageant. The following Nuestra Belleza Guanajuato contestants were invited to compete in Nuestra Belleza México.

External links
Official Website

Nuestra Belleza México